Local elections were held in Belgrade on 3 April 2022 to elect members of the City Assembly. Alongside the election, national-level general elections and local elections in 12 other towns and municipalities were held on the same day.

Background 

Following the vote of no confidence in 2013, Dragan Đilas was dismissed as mayor, and a temporary body was set up by the Serbian Progressive Party (SNS), who has ruled Belgrade since then. The current session of the City Assembly was elected in 2018, after SNS, Socialist Party of Serbia (SPS) and United Serbia (JS) formed a majority. Zoran Radojičić, an independent endorsed by SNS, was elected mayor, succeeding Siniša Mali, while Goran Vesić was elected deputy mayor. The 2018 election also marked the return of Đragan Đilas to politics, and his list ended up gaining 26 seats, while the list led by Aleksandar Šapić won 12 seats.

Later that year, the Alliance for Serbia (SzS) was formed by Đilas, along with Vuk Jeremić, Zoran Lutovac, and Boško Obradović. It was a major opposition alliance, that also played a key role in the 2018–2020 protests, and it boycotted the 2020 parliamentary election. Municipal elections were held in Belgrade after the parliamentary election, in which, SNS won a majority in all 16 Belgrade municipalities except New Belgrade, where the Serbian Patriotic Alliance (SPAS), which was led by Aleksandar Šapić, managed to form a local government, third time in a row. During that period, protests erupted in Belgrade over the announcement of the reimplementation of the curfew and government's allegedly poor handling of the COVID-19 pandemic. The demonstrators took to the streets, stormed the National Assembly building, and clashed with the police. The clashes and riots continued for the next few days, while the police used excessive force.

In May 2021, Šapić merged his party into SNS, after which he was promoted to vice president of the party. A series of environmental protests have been held in Belgrade as early as January 2021, although since September 2021, the protests have garnered greater attention, which led to roadblocks on the Gazela Bridge in November and December 2021.

Electoral system 
Local elections in Belgrade are held under a proportional representation system. Voters in Belgrade will determine the composition of the City Assembly, which in turn elects the mayor. Shortly prior the election, parties must submit a ballot list and their ballot leader. One mandate of a mayor and an elected member of the City Assembly lasts four years.

On 15 February 2022, Ivica Dačić, the president of the National Assembly, called the local elections.

Political parties 

The table below lists political parties represented in the City Assembly of Belgrade after the 2018 election.

Pre-election composition

Electoral lists 
The following are the official electoral lists published by the Belgrade City Electoral Commission (GIK).

Campaign

Slogans

Party campaigns

Serbian Progressive Party 
In January 2022, the Serbian Progressive Party chose Aleksandar Šapić as their candidate for mayor, and GIK confirmed their ballot list on 17 February.

Opinion polls

Mayor preferences

Results 
The following results were published with 88.63% of polling stations reporting. Voting was repeated at three voting stations on 16 April and on two voting stations on 21 April. Final results were published on 9 May. SNS and SPS won the most votes in Suburban municipalities, such as Obrenovac, Barajevo and others, while UZPS and Moramo got a majority of their votes from central municipalities such as Vračar, Stari Grad and Savski Venac.

Aftermath 
Preliminary results were published a day after the elections. Opposition parties had managed to win more votes than the governing parties, although the opposition Social Democratic Party remained below the threshold. The We Must coalition called for a discussion between opposition parties, while the National Democratic Alternative and Dveri have stated that they would cooperate with other opposition parties to form a local government. Zoran Alimpić, the representative of the United for the Victory of Belgrade coalition, and the We Must coalition stated that irregularities occurred during the election day. The opposition held a press conference on 5 April.

Following the conference, Dragan Đilas and Marinika Tepić stated that "the shortest route would be to call early elections". Đilas later met with Aleksandar Vučić to discuss the outcome of the elections. The move was criticized by the People's Party and Serbian Party Oathkeepers, while Zoran Lutovac, president of the Democratic Party, said that Đilas did not consult with other coalition members before the meeting. Radomir Lazović, a representative of the We Must coalition, stated that "two people [Vučić and Đilas] should not decide on matters that are far beyond their competence". Dveri had stated their support for the formation of a minority government.

The Social Democratic Party failed to cross the threshold even after the repeated elections on 16 and 21 April; they have claimed that the votes were stolen in order for them to not cross the threshold. Opposition parties have stated that the next elections might be called earlier. Lutovac stated that he would prefer to create a wide alliance of moderate parties for the next election, while Pavle Grbović, the leader of the Movement of Free Citizens, stated that his party might leave the coalition in order to continue alone. On 20 June, Aleksandar Šapić was chosen as mayor of Belgrade.

Notes and references

Notes

References

Belgrade City Assembly election
Local elections in Serbia
Elections in Belgrade
2022 elections in Serbia
Belgrade